Tiklla (Quechua for eyelash; two-colored, Hispanicized spellings Teclla, Ticcla, Ticlla) or Tiqlla (Quechua for 'with alternating colors') may refer to:

 Tiklla or Qutuni, a mountain in the Lima Region, Peru
 Tiklla (Castilla), a mountain in the Chachas District, Castilla Province, Arequipa Region, Peru
 Tiklla (Caylloma-Tuti), a mountain on the border of the Caylloma District and the Tuti District, Caylloma Province, Arequipa Region, Peru
 Tiklla (Lari), a mountain in the Lari District, Caylloma Province, Arequipa Region, Peru
 Tiklla (Qaqamayu), a mountain at the Qaqamayu in the Chachas District, Castilla Province, Arequipa Region, Peru